Marcus Aurélio Martins (born 18 August 1973) is a Brazilian mixed martial artist. He formerly fought for the PRIDE Fighting Championships and for the Ultimate Fighting Championship. He currently does stunt and mo-cap work, after an MMA career with fights as a lightweight, and primarily employs Brazilian Jiu Jitsu. He is known for having never been finished in MMA competition and use of Capoeira.

Mixed martial arts career

Early career
Aurélio began his career in promotions such as ZST and HOOKnSHOOT, earning notable submission victories against Remigijus Morkevicius and Rich Clementi.  Aurelio then came to PRIDE Bushido, where he defeated PRIDE Lightweight Champion Takanori Gomi with an arm triangle in a non title fight. A rematch for the title was scheduled six months later, which Gomi won by a controversial split decision.

Ultimate Fighting Championship
On 24 June 2007, Aurelio announced his signing with the UFC.  He made his debut at UFC 74, losing to Clay Guida by split decision.

Aurelio won his next fight over Luke Caudillo via first round TKO at UFC 78.

He was defeated by Evan Dunham on 29 August 2009 at UFC 102. He replaced Matt Veach who sustained a back injury while training.

After his defeat at the hands of Dunham, Aurelio was released from the organization, along with fellow UFC veterans, Chris Wilson, and Justin McCully.

After racking up two consecutive wins in his post UFC career, Aurelio faced Japanese grappler Shinya Aoki at Dream 16.  Aoki utilized superior ground control to take a unanimous decision.

Championships and accomplishments
ZST
ZST Grand Prix Winner (One time)
HOOKnSHOOT
HnS Southeast Lightweight Championship (One time)
United States Mixed Martial Arts
USMMA Lightweight Championship (One time; first)

Mixed martial arts record

|-
| Win
| align=center| 22–10
| Garrett Gross
| Submission (armbar)
| WF-Warrior Fight
| 
| align=center| 1
| align=center| 4:56
| Fortaleza, Brazil
| 
|-
| Loss
| align=center| 21–10
| Lyle Beerbohm
| Decision (unanimous)
| ShoFight 20
| 
| align=center| 3
| align=center| 5:00
| Springfield, Missouri, United States
| 
|-
| Win
| align=center| 21–9
| Matt McGrath
| Submission (armbar)
| MMA Live 1
| 
| align=center| 1
| align=center| 3:39
| London, Ontario, Canada
| 
|-
| Loss
| align=center| 20–9
| Shinya Aoki
| Decision (unanimous)
| Dream 16
| 
| align=center| 2
| align=center| 5:00
| Nagoya, Japan
| 
|-
| Win
| align=center| 20–8
| Niko Puhakka
| Submission (rear naked choke)
| Fight Festival 27
| 
| align=center| 2
| align=center| 2:40
| Helsinki, Finland
| 
|-
| Win
| align=center| 19–8
| Daniel Aspe
| Submission (rear-naked choke)
| NDC 1 – Peru vs. American Top Team
| 
| align=center| 2
| align=center| 2:37
| Lima, Peru
| 
|-
| Loss
| align=center| 18–8
| Evan Dunham					
| Decision (split)
| UFC 102
| 
| align=center| 3
| align=center| 5:00
| Portland, Oregon, United States
| 
|-
| Win
| align=center| 18–7
| Joey Gorczynski
| Submission (rear naked choke)
| 5150 Combat: Rumble at the Rally
| 
| align=center| 1
| align=center| 3:45
| Oklahoma, United States
| 
|-
| Win
| align=center| 17–7
| Chris Liguori
| KO (punch)
| WCA: Pure Combat
| 
| align=center| 2
| align=center| 0:23
| New Jersey, United States
| 
|-
| Loss
| align=center| 16–7
| Hermes França
| Decision (unanimous)
| UFC 90
| 
| align=center| 3
| align=center| 5:00
| Rosemont, Illinois, United States
| 
|-
| Loss
| align=center| 16–6
| Tyson Griffin
| Decision (unanimous)
| UFC 86
| 
| align=center| 3
| align=center| 5:00
| Las Vegas, Nevada, United States
| 
|-
| Win
| align=center| 16–5
| Ryan Roberts
| Submission (armbar)
| UFC Fight Night 13
| 
| align=center| 1
| align=center| 0:16
| Broomfield, Colorado, United States
| 
|-
| Win
| align=center| 15–5
| Luke Caudillo
| TKO (strikes)
| UFC 78
| 
| align=center| 1
| align=center| 4:29
| Newark, New Jersey, United States
| 
|-
| Loss
| align=center| 14–5
| Clay Guida
| Decision (split)
| UFC 74
| 
| align=center| 3
| align=center| 5:00
| Las Vegas, Nevada, United States
| UFC debut
|-
| Loss
| align=center| 14–4
| Takanori Gomi
| Decision (split)
| Pride - Bushido 13
| 
| align=center| 2
| align=center| 5:00
| Yokohama, Japan
| 
|-
| Loss
| align=center| 14–3
| Mitsuhiro Ishida
| Decision (unanimous)
| Pride - Bushido 11
| 
| align=center| 2
| align=center| 5:00
| Saitama, Saitama, Japan
| 
|-
| Win
| align=center| 14–2
| Takanori Gomi
| Technical Submission (arm triangle choke)
| Pride - Bushido 10
| 
| align=center| 1
| align=center| 4:34
| Tokyo, Japan
| 
|-
| Win
| align=center| 13–2
| Jutaro Nakao
| Decision (unanimous)
| PRIDE Bushido 8
| 
| align=center| 2
| align=center| 5:00
| Nagoya, Japan
| 
|-
| Win
| align=center| 12–2
| Daisuke Nakamura
| Decision (unanimous)
| PRIDE Bushido 6
| 
| align=center| 2
| align=center| 5:00
| Yokohama, Japan
| 
|-
| Loss
| align=center| 11–2
| Dokonjonosuke Mishima
| Decision (split)
| PRIDE Bushido 4
| 
| align=center| 2
| align=center| 5:00
| Nagoya, Japan
| 
|-
| Win
| align=center| 11–1
| Naoyuki Kotani
| TKO (cut)
| ZST.5
| 
| align=center| 2
| align=center| 3:34
| Tokyo, Japan
| 
|-
| Win
| align=center| 10–1
| Remigijus Morkevicius
| Submission (triangle choke)
| ZST: Grand Prix Final Round
| 
| align=center| 1
| align=center| 2:48
| Tokyo, Japan
| 
|-
| Win
| align=center| 9–1
| Masakazu Imanari
| Decision (split)
| ZST: Grand Prix Final Round
| 
| align=center| 2
| align=center| 5:00
| Tokyo, Japan
| 
|-
| Win
| align=center| 8–1
| Rich Clementi
| Submission (injury)
| ZST: Grand Prix Final Round
| 
| align=center| 1
| align=center| 0:40
| Tokyo, Japan
| 
|-
| Win
| align=center| 7–1
| Takumi Nakayama
| Submission (armbar)
| ZST: Grand Prix Opening Round
| 
| align=center| 1
| align=center| 3:05
| Tokyo, Japan
| 
|-
| Win
| align=center| 6–1
| James Dunn
| TKO (corner stoppage)
| Mass Destruction 12
| 
| align=center| 1
| align=center| 5:00
| Massachusetts, United States
| 
|-
| Loss
| align=center| 5–1
| Antonio McKee
| Decision (split)
| KOTC 27: Aftermath
| 
| align=center| 2
| align=center| 5:00
| California, United States
| 
|-
| Win
| align=center| 5–0
| Darrell Smith
| Submission (triangle choke)
| Absolute Fighting Championships 3
| 
| align=center| 1
| align=center| 2:35
| Florida, United States
| 
|-
| Win
| align=center| 4–0
| David Gardner
| Submission (armbar)
| USMMA 3: Ring of Fury
| 
| align=center| 3
| align=center| 4:13
| Massachusetts, United States
| 
|-
| Win
| align=center| 3–0
| Justin Wisniewski
| Submission (armbar)
| Absolute Fighting Championships 2
| 
| align=center| 1
| align=center| 1:14
| Florida, United States
| 
|-
| Win
| align=center| 2–0
| Scott Johnson
| Submission (armbar)
| XFA 5: Redemption
| 
| align=center| 1
| align=center| 3:31
| Florida, United States
| 
|-
| Win
| align=center| 1–0
| Walter McCall
| Submission (triangle choke)
| WEFC 1: Bring It On
| 
| align=center| 2
| align=center| 2:45
| Georgia, United States
|

References

External links
 
 

1973 births
Living people
Brazilian male mixed martial artists
Brazilian practitioners of Brazilian jiu-jitsu
Brazilian capoeira practitioners
Brazilian expatriates in Canada
Lightweight mixed martial artists
Mixed martial artists utilizing boxing
Mixed martial artists utilizing capoeira
Mixed martial artists utilizing wrestling
Mixed martial artists utilizing Brazilian jiu-jitsu
People awarded a black belt in Brazilian jiu-jitsu
Sportspeople from Fortaleza
Ultimate Fighting Championship male fighters